Sihanoukville Autonomous Port (PAS) is a government agency and state corporation of Cambodia and Sihanoukville that operates and governs the country's sole deep water port. In Sihanoukville, on the Bay of Kampong Som of the Gulf of Thailand in south-western Cambodia. The port was inaugurated in 1960 as construction of the Old Jetty's four berths had begun in 1955.

Since the port has continuously been extended. Several berths, a container terminal, a tanker terminal and an industrial effluent treatment plant were added. The beams were assembled on site and proved to be very difficult to maneuver. A small railway was constructed to transport the beams from the assembly site.

In order to cope with the increasing rates of cargo throughput, the government of Cambodia had constructed another -long new quay with  maximum draft in 1966. At present, this new quay can accommodate three vessels with  draft.

PAS' board of directors is appointed by a variety of government ministries.  The port employs currently more than 1000 persons. In 2003, PAS acquired the remaining 70% of the Cambodia CWT Dry Port near Phnom Penh. In addition to the 30% share already held, this made the state-owned Sihanoukville Autonomous Port the sole proprietor of the dry port. The port became a listed company in June 2017 in the Cambodian Stock Market.

History
Before and during the period of the French Protectorate, no deep water port existed to handle international marine trade. The small port at the Tonle Sap River near Phnom Penh had insufficient capabilities, as it handled ships of up to 3000 tons during the dry season and 4000 tons during the wet season. The French colonial administration preferred to use Saigon for international trade and the Mekong River for further distribution. Thus Cambodia's access to high sea's trade was via the Mekong which required passage through Vietnamese territory. Independence from France for both Vietnam and Cambodia in 1953 highlighted the need for a Cambodian deep-water port.

A number of sites were initially considered suitable for the new facility, including Kampot, the small outpost at Ream, and Sre Ambel. However, the deep waters off a rocky promontory near Koh Pos at the mouth of the Kampong Som Bay were finally chosen as the site for Cambodia's first ocean port.

Construction began in 1955 with US$12 million in funding from the French government and was completed in late-1959. The port was inaugurated in April 1960 by Louis Jacquinot, the French Minister of State.

The first marina, near the breakwater island of Koh Preab, Sihanoukville, went into service in October 2013.

Traffic
In 2018, the port earned US$8.7 million in profits, up 43% from 2017. It handled 537,107 TEUs, up 17%, totalling 5.2 million tonnes.

See also
 Government of Cambodia
 Transport in Cambodia
 Port authority
 Port operator
 Sihanoukville

References

External links
 Sihanoukville Autonomous Port official site
 Unofficial Sihanoukville Port site
 Marina Oceania

Government of Cambodia
Transport in Cambodia
Sihanoukville (city)
Sihanoukville
Government agencies of Cambodia